Reunited is the ninth studio album by Tongan-American family band The Jets, released on January 15, 2014, by Refinement Records. As of January 2023, it is their most recent release.

Reunited features six new songs, as well as four re-recordings of these past hits: "Cross My Broken Heart", "Make It Real", "Crush on You", and "You Got It All" At this point, the band was composed of Eddie, Elizabeth, Haini, Kathi, Leroy, Moana, Natalia and Rudy Wolfgramm.

Track listing
 "Cross My Broken Heart"
 "Make It Real"
 "Pass Me By"
 "So Cool"
 "Take My Hand"
 "Crush on You"
 "You Got It All"
 "Pride"
 "Believe in Love"
 "Don't"

References 

2014 albums
The Jets (band) albums